The Case Swedish Open 2012 is the 2012's Swedish Open, which is a tournament of the PSA World Tour event International (Prize money : 70 000 $). The event took place in Linköping in Sweden from 2 to 5 February. Grégory Gaultier won his first Swedish Open trophy, beating Karim Darwish in the final.

Prize money and ranking points
For 2012, the prize purse was $70,000. The prize money and points breakdown is as follows:

Seeds

Draw and results

See also
PSA World Tour 2012
Swedish Open (squash)

References

External links
PSA Case Swedish Open 2012 website
Case Swedish Open official website

Swedish Open Squash
Squash tournaments in Sweden
2012 in Swedish sport